Anastasia and Tatiana Dogaru (born 13 January 2004) are craniopagus conjoined twins. They were scheduled to begin the first of several surgeries to separate them at Rainbow Babies and Children's Medical Center in Cleveland, Ohio. However, in August 2007 the surgery was called off as too dangerous.

The twins were born in Rome, Italy to Romanian parents, Alin Dogaru, a Byzantine Catholic priest, and Claudia Dogaru, a nurse. Their mother heard about the successful separation of Egyptian-born twins who were also joined at the head and hoped her children could also be successfully separated. The Dogaru family — who also have an older daughter, Maria, and younger son Theodor — were brought to north Texas by the World Craniofacial Foundation to have Anastasia and Tatiana evaluated for possible separation.

The girls are currently developing normally for their age and speak both Romanian and English. They get around with Anastasia leading the way and Tatiana following. The top of Tatiana's head is attached to the back of Anastasia's. Anastasia, whose kidneys don't function, relies on her sister's kidneys, and Tatiana on her sister's circulatory system. The girls also share blood flow to the back of the brain and some brain matter. Doctors estimated the twins had only a 50 percent chance of surviving the surgery. There were also risks of complications, such as brain damage, but the girls also risk early death if they remain conjoined. Their parents believed separation would give them their best chance at living a normal life.

In May 2007, doctors used a catheter to insert wire coils into the veins of the two girls, successfully redirecting their blood flow. It was the first time the procedure was attempted in conjoined twins. Doctors pushed back the first of the planned separation surgeries to June 2007 while studying the complex circulatory system of the twins, but, in August of that year, decided it was too risky.

Notes

External links
World Craniofacial Foundation

2004 births
Living people
Conjoined twins
Romanian twins
Italian twins
People from Rome